Horace Belshaw (9 February 1898 – 20 March 1962) was a New Zealand teacher, economist and university professor. He was born in Wigan, Lancashire, England on 9 February 1898.

In 1935, he was awarded the King George V Silver Jubilee Medal.

References

1898 births
1962 deaths
New Zealand educators
Academic staff of the University of Auckland
English emigrants to New Zealand
People educated at Christchurch Boys' High School
University of Canterbury alumni
People from Wigan
20th-century New Zealand economists
Food and Agriculture Organization officials